Zhanaarka District is a district of Ulytau Region in central Kazakhstan. The administrative center of the district is the settlement of Atasu. Population:

References

Districts of Kazakhstan
Ulytau Region